Ascaltis grisea is a species of sea sponge in the family Leucascidae, first described as Leucosolenia grisea by Arthur Dendy in 1891. It is known only from its type locality on the Houtman Albrolhos  archipeligo in Western Australia.  It is a marine sessile filter-feeder.

References 

Clathrinida
Animals described in 1924
Taxa named by Arthur Dendy
Sponges of Australia
Sponges described in 1924